The Frankish Tower was a medieval tower built on the Acropolis of Athens by the Franks as part of the palace of the Dukes of Athens. It was demolished by the Greek authorities in 1874, on the initiative and with funding from Heinrich Schliemann.

Location and appearance
Literary sources attest to the fact that the door was accessible by means of an external wooden staircase. On the other hand, a couple of photographs also show a ground entrance on the western side, which means that the lower portion of the tower was probably separate from the upper, and used as a prison or storage room.

The tower was built of stone from the quarries of Penteli and Piraeus, making heavy use of material from the ancient buildings of the Acropolis. The north side of the tower had a small, square turret that projected from the wall, atop which "beacon-fires could be kindled which would be visible from Acrocorinth" in the Peloponnese. Old sketches from the late 17th century on also show that the tower was crenellated.

History

The date of construction is unclear, and following its demolition now impossible to reconstruct with any certainty. Construction is usually ascribed to the Acciaioli family, who ruled the Duchy of Athens between 1388 and its fall to the Ottoman Empire in 1458, since it was they who converted the Propylaea complex into a palace. However, according to medievalist Peter Lock, the tower "might equally be ascribed" to the first dynasty of Frankish dukes of Athens, the 13th-century de la Roche, who also had a residence on the site, of which no details are known.

The tower may be the inspiration for the "grete tour" in the palace of the Duke of Athens, where Palamon is imprisoned in Chaucer's The Knight's Tale. Under Ottoman rule the tower—known locally as Goulas or Koulas (Γουλάς/Κουλάς, from Turkish kule, "tower")—was used as a salt store and a prison. When the Greek War of Independence broke out in 1821, twelve Athenian notables were imprisoned here by the Ottoman authorities as hostages, of whom nine were executed during the 1821–1822 siege of the Acropolis by the Greek rebels and three managed to escape. In 1825, the Greek military leader Odysseas Androutsos was imprisoned at the tower by his political rivals, tortured and finally killed.

The tower was dismantled in 1874, as part of a wider cleaning-up of the Acropolis from post-Classical buildings, a project initiated and financed by Heinrich Schliemann. The demolition of such an "integral part of the Athenian horizon" (Théophile Gautier) drew considerable criticism at the time. Work began on 2 July, amid great publicity organised by Schliemann, but a few days later the demolition was halted at the order of King George I, prompting Schliemann to write an indignant letter of protest to the King. Despite the latter's opposition, the tower was eventually torn down. The eminent historian of Frankish Greece, William Miller, later called it "an act of vandalism unworthy of any people imbued with a sense of the continuity of history", and "pedantic barbarism".

References

Sources

External links
 
 Photographs and paintings of the tower, Archaeology of the City of Athens website, National Research Foundation 
 Medieval Acropolis and Ottoman Acropolis at Ancient Athens 3D

Acropolis of Athens
Towers in Greece
Duchy of Athens
Demolished buildings and structures in Greece
Buildings and structures demolished in 1874
Medieval defences